A chocolate museum is any museum covering the subject of chocolate.  The list of chocolate museums includes:

See also

 List of food and beverage museums

References

Lists of museums by subject